Parkan-e Gishu (also Romanized as Parkān-e-Gīshū and Parkān Gīshū) is a village in Rudbar Rural District, Ruydar District, Khamir County, Hormozgan Province, Iran. At the 2006 census, its population was 227, in 61 families.

References 

Populated places in Khamir County